The  is a professional wrestling world heavyweight championship in the Japanese All Japan Pro Wrestling promotion. The current champion is Yuji Nagata, who is in his first reign.

Title history 
The championship was established after the unification of its then-flagship title the PWF World Heavyweight Championship, with the NWA United National Championship and the NWA International Heavyweight Championship. The titles were unified on April 18, 1989, when NWA International Heavyweight Champion Jumbo Tsuruta defeated the PWF World Heavyweight and NWA United National Champion Stan Hansen.

Unlike most unified championships, the Triple Crown was originally represented through the continued use of the three individual championship belts. From 1989 to 2000, the holder of the Triple Crown was also presented by Nippon TV (AJPW's broadcaster at the time) with a large, globe-shaped trophy bearing the words "World Heavyweight Champion." The original title belts were returned to All Japan founder Giant Baba's widow Motoko in August 2013 and a new single title belt incorporating designs from the three original belts was made. The new title belt, which featured three plates representing the three original title belts, was unveiled on October 27. One of the plates includes the text "Jumbo Tsuruta Apr. 18 1989", representing the crowning of the inaugural champion. There have been a total of 29 recognized champions who have had a combined 68 official reigns. 

The current champion is Yuji Nagata, who is in his first reign. He defeated Kento Miyahara on February 19, 2023 at Excite Series - Night 2: Pro-Wrestling Day MANIAx in Tokyo, Japan.

Reigns

Combined reigns

References

External links 
 Triple Crown Heavyweight Championship at All-Japan.co.jp
 Wrestling-Titles.com: Triple Crown Heavyweight Title
 Triple Crown Heavyweight Championship

1989 establishments in Japan
All Japan Pro Wrestling championships
World heavyweight wrestling championships